The Olympus Zuiko Digital ED 14-35mm 1:2.0 SWD is an interchangeable camera lens announced by Olympus Corporation on February 17, 2005.

References

External links
 

Camera lenses introduced in 2005
014-035mm 1:2.0 SWD